Action Item is a four-piece pop rock band based out of Bergen County, NJ.

History

Action Item started off as a five-piece consisting of Cag, Li, Brozek, Buczkowski, and Politz. After self-releasing numerous songs via their Myspace page, the four current members of Action Item parted way with Joe Politz, their first vocalist, and started a nearly year-long search for a new permanent vocalist. Eventually, Brian Cag and Anthony Li would take over the vocal duties, oftentimes both singing on the same songs.

In early 2008, Action Item headed to Chicago, IL to record their debut EP with Tom Schleiter of Powerspace. The songs recorded during this session would become Action Item's debut EP The World And I.

After the recording of The World And I, Action Item recruited a guitarist/keyboardist/vocalist by the name of Mark Shami, formerly of the Bergen County, NJ band Off Broadway. Shortly thereafter The World And I was released on June 14, 2008.

The band spent the summer of 2008 doing various east coast tours, and played the NJ date of Warped Tour on the Ernie Ball Battle Of The Bands stage.

The band did a YouTube version to their hit song "Brave" with famous YouTubers Kurt Hugo Schneider and Sam Tsui

Nick Jonas helped write and produce Action Item's song 'Learn To Fly (released July 2011), and appeared in the music video along with Drake Bell. The band and Jonas have become good friends.

In 2013, the band released an album entitled Resolution, which reached #72 on the Billboard 200.

In May 2014, over a year and a half later from leaving the Action Item, Mark Shami sat down with Giancarlo Dittamo for his podcast, Pop Cultivation, to discuss his departure.

Members
Current members
Anthony Li - Vocals/Guitar
Brian Cag - Vocals/Guitar
David Buczkowski - Bass
Dan Brozek - Drums

Touring members
Jeremy William Smith

Former members
Mark Shami - Guitar/Keyboards/Vocals

Discography
The World And I (2008)
The Stronger the Love (EP) (2010)
Learn To Fly (EP) (2011)
Last Day Of Summer (EP) (2012)
Resolution (2013)
Great Mission: Life (EP) (2014)
Great Mission: Love (EP) (2015)

Singles
Boy With The Microphone (The World And I)
Somewhere Out There (The Stronger The Love)
When Everything Falls Back Down (The Stronger The Love)
Learn To Fly
Winter Rolls Around
Marching Band
Last Day Of Summer
Brave
The Start of Something
We'll Be Fine

References

External links
Official Facebook
Official Twitter

Musical groups from New Jersey